SEA LIFE Sydney Aquarium (formerly Sydney Aquarium) is a public aquarium that features a large variety of Australian aquatic life, displaying more than 700 species comprising more than 13,000 individual fish and other sea and water creatures from most of Australia's water habitats. Opened in 1988, it is regarded as one of Sydney's premier tourist attractions with over 55% of its visitors each year coming from overseas.

The aquarium features 14 themed zones including Jurassic Seas, Discovery Rockpool, Shark Walk, and the world's largest Great Barrier Reef display. Along the way, visitors encounter animals unique to each habitat, including one of only four dugongs on display in the world, sharks, stingrays, penguins and tropical fish, among others.

It is a public aquarium located in the city of Sydney, New South Wales, Australia.  It is located on the eastern (city) side of Darling Harbour to the north of the Pyrmont Bridge. It is a full institutional member of the Zoo and Aquarium Association (ZAA) and the World Association of Zoos and Aquariums (WAZA).

History

The aquarium was designed by Australian architects to resemble a large wave, to complement the underwater theme of an aquarium and the maritime theme of Darling Harbour, and took nearly two years to build. The Great Barrier Reef complex which opened in October 1998 continues this same theme.

In December 1991, the first Seal Sanctuary was opened.  Since then, Sydney Aquarium has upgraded the facilities and a new oceanarium to house seals opened in September 2003. The Seal Sanctuary features Australian sea lions, Australian fur seals, subantarctic fur seals, and New Zealand fur seals.  In this floating oceanarium, the seals can be seen below the water's surface from underwater viewing tunnels, and from above on an open-air deck.  The Seal Sanctuary is incorporated into the Southern Oceans exhibit, which also features little penguins, the Open Ocean Oceanarium, and Sydney Harbour displays.

In October 1998, the Great Barrier Reef complex opened comprising a tropical touch pool, a live coral cave, coral atoll, two circular gateway displays and a massive Great Barrier Reef oceanarium. Over 6,000 animals are housed in the oceanarium which contains 2.6 million litres (572,000 imp gal, 687,000 U.S. gal) of water pumped from Darling Harbour, filtered and heated before it flows into the Oceanarium and adjoining display tanks.

In 2006, Wild Life Sydney opened next to Sydney Aquarium, which is also owned by Merlin Entertainments.

On 20 December 2007, the glass-bottomed boat, or Shark Explorer, began operating, giving guests a tour of the Great Barrier Reef tank. A crocodile exhibit was added in 2008.

In 2008 the seal sanctuary was closed and the seals were sent to Sea World, Gold Coast, Australia. The seal sanctuary was then renovated and reopened as Dugong Island in December 2008, with two dugongs, Wuru and Pig, transferred there from the Gold Coast, also in 2008. Wuru died in 2018. The remaining dugong, Pig, is the only captive dugong in Australia. Dugong Island has above-water viewing areas as well as underwater viewing tunnels.

Other animals kept in the oceanarium include a shark ray, shovelnose rays, zebra sharks, eagle rays and dozens of different species of fish.

In March 2012, SEA LIFE Sydney Aquarium's owners, Merlin Entertainments, announced that they would be spending $10 million on the refurbishment of the facilities. As part of the process, the aquarium was rebranded as a Sea Life Centre and was relaunched on 24 September 2012.

Exhibits

The SEA LIFE Sydney Aquarium has distinctly Australian themes and exhibits, which take visitors through the continent's waterways and marine ecosystems.  Exhibits cover the rivers of Australia, exploring the Southern and Northern River habitats, as well as the oceans of Australia, through the Southern and Northern Ocean habitats.  The complex and fragile nature of Australia's very different and unique aquatic environments is emphasised.

Some of the displays are housed in the main exhibit hall and others are housed in floating oceanariums. Dugong Island and Shark Valley comprise two massive oceanariums, amongst the largest in the world, and have underwater tunnels allowing visitors to examine marine life at close quarters. In the Shark Valley Oceanarium, SEA LIFE Sydney Aquarium houses a large collection of sharks including Lemon Sharks and Grey Nurse Sharks.

The SEA LIFE Sydney Aquarium is split into the following exhibit areas and highlights:
Jurassic Seas
Shark Walk & Shark Valley
Dugong Island
Dugong exhibit
Southern Ocean
Little penguins habitat
Sydney Harbour
Open Ocean Oceanarium
Northern Ocean
Great Barrier Reef Oceanarium
South Coast Shipwreck
Day and Night on the Reef

Research and conservation

The SEA LIFE Sydney Aquarium has provided facilities and/or assistance have been provided to research institutions including the University of Sydney, the University of New South Wales, the La Trobe University, Indiana University, the Australian Museum, the Queensland National Parks and Wildlife Service and the New South Wales Fisheries Research Institute.

SEA LIFE Sydney Aquarium and its conservation charity SEA LIFE Trust has assisted by providing holding facilities for animals used in many research projects carried out by these organisations. In recent years, the aquarium has been involved in the tagging of sea turtles and sharks, collections for research and the holding of invertebrates for research. Other projects include the effects of heavy metal contamination in marine environments and fish tag longevity on rays.

The aquarium also shares conservation information to visitors through its program Breed, Rescue, Protect.

See also

 Merlin Entertainments
 Taronga Zoo
 Sydney Tower
 Manly Sea Life
 Wild Life Sydney

Notes

External links

 
 

Sea Life Centres
Aquarium
Aquarium
Aquaria in Australia
1988 establishments in Australia
Darling Harbour